J19 may refer to:

Roads 
 County Route J19 (California)
 Johor State Route J19, in Malaysia

Vehicles

Locomotives 
 GSR Class J19, an Irish steam locomotive
 LNER Class J19, a British steam locomotive class

Ships 
 , a Halland-class destroyer of the Swedish Navy
 , a Sandhayak-class survey ship of the Indian Navy

Other uses 
 J19 (journal), a scholarly journal
 Elongated square cupola, a Johnson solid (J19)